Treacle Jr. is a 2010 British film written and directed by Jamie Thraves and starring Aidan Gillen, Tom Fisher, and Riann Steele.

Plot
The film opens with Tom eating with his family. He drives to Birmingham, and boards the London train. After walking all day, he sleeps outside a shop. In the morning, he throws his phone into a lake, bins his bank cards (eventually retaining a family photo) but keeps his money. That night, drinking in the park, he is attacked by a gang of youths; fleeing, he runs into a tree, injuring himself. The next morning, waiting in A&E, Aidan behaves disruptively, then starts talking to Tom before Tom is called for examination. When Tom leaves, Aidan follows him.

Walking together, Aidan goes to urinate. Tom, seeing his chance, flees, spots a couple having sex but then runs into Aidan again. When Tom, who is still trying to drop Aidan, faints outside Aidan's flat, and Aidan takes him inside and gives him a beer. Aidan's 'girlfriend' Linda arrives home, surprising Tom, who saw her having sex. She is displeased Aidan made little money, punches him and says to throw Tom out. Tom leaves and tries to buy a tea. Finding his pocket empty, he returns to the flat. Linda denies knowledge of the money, will not let him look for it and smirks as he leaves.

After begging for change successfully, he buys tea in a café. Aidan enters with a cat carrier and offers mousecatching. The manager takes him out the back and attacks him. Tom hears the assault and checks his health. Aidan realizes the cat, which belongs to Aidan’s elderly neighbour, is missing. They find it dead and buy a kitten for the cat's owner, who yells at them to leave.

Aidan takes Tom to show him a drum kit he is saving for, having dreams of fame. Tom tells him to leave him alone, admitting he cannot cope with people, including his family. Depressed, Tom takes out the family photo, and finds a bank card, which he uses to withdraw cash. He goes back to Aidan's flat, apologizes, and asks to stay, offering £200. Aidan tells Linda has paid £100 (keeping the rest for his kit), and they celebrate. However Aidan, drunk, tells Linda that he actually received £200 and is saving towards a drum kit. Linda also realizes that Tom is "Mr. Moneybags" and masturbates him.

The next day, Aidan takes Tom to the Horniman Museum and they enjoy making music with the instruments for public use. Aidan later withdraws his savings, but is seen by a man, who may have been following him. As Aidan walks home, the man mugs him. Tom asks for a description and realizes the mugger was Linda's sexual partner. Linda returns home with many designer clothes. Linda, allergic to cats, finds the kitten hidden in the wardrobe and attacks Aidan. When Tom protests, Linda threatens hims with retaliation by her gangster friends. Tom then menaces her with a knife, grabbing her by the throat and demanding she confesses to stealing the money. Frightened, she has an asthma attack. Aidan grabs for her inhaler, but it falls under the fridge. With Linda falling into unconsciousness, they eventually recover it. Aidan kicks her out permanently and suffers her abuse.

Aidan goes to the shop to see the drum kit, but finds it has been sold, which greatly upsets him. He returns home and finds Tom gone, making him more upset. Entering his bedroom, he finds the kit, which Tom has bought for him. The film ends with Aidan drumming and Tom walking to a train station and taking the train home.

Cast
Tom Fisher as Tom
Aidan Gillen as Aidan
Riann Steele as Linda
 Chris Wade as Drug Dealer (and the man who steals Aidan's money)
 Judy Norman as Clairvoyant
 Carrie Cohen as Mrs Brophy, the elderly neighbour	
 Cristina Catalina as Waitress	
 Taylan Halici as Café Owner	
 Liz Fleming as Ruby	
 Spencer Cowan as Honeytrap Thug
 Atli Gunnarsson as Thug	
 Lucas Hansen as Thug	
 Steven James Tyler as Thug

Reception
Peter Bradshaw of The Guardian gave the film three out of five stars, describing it as a "low-key portrait of a south-east London odd-job man with a big performance by Aidan Gillen, and the return of promising film-maker Jamie Thraves". 
As of late-2014, it held an 84% positive review on Rotten Tomatoes.

Notes
  Gillen reportedly based the character of Aidan on his long-term acquaintance, musician Aidan Walsh

References

External links
 
 
 

2010 films
British independent films
2010s English-language films
2010s British films